Betty McKenna [Mac] (May 31, 1931 – February 24, 1992) was a third basewoman who played from  through  in the All-American Girls Professional Baseball League. McKenna batted and threw right-handed. She was born in Lisbon, Ohio.

A solid all-around athlete, McKenna got off to a slow start in the AAGPBL in her rookie season. She entered the league in 1951 with the Fort Wayne Daisies, playing for them in a few games before joining the Peoria Redwings during the midseason and ending the year with the  Battle Creek Belles, batting .151 in 61 games, including six doubles and one triple.

After hitting .077 in 1952 in just 61 games, McKenna moved with the Belles when they relocated to Muskegon, Michigan before the 1953 season. This time she took over the full-time role at third base and blossomed into one of the better defenders of the hot corner in the league, setting career-numbers in average (.215), hits (63), runs (31), runs batted in (28), stolen bases (16) and games (94). Still only 22 years old, she was becoming a full-pledged star player, but the Belles, after two championship titles in the 1940s and two reincarnations in the 1950s, folded after 1953 season while the BBGPBL, too, folded a year later.

McKenna died in Ohio at the age of 60.

Sources
Encyclopedia of women and baseball - Leslie A. Heaphy, Mel Anthony May. Publisher: McFarland & Co., 2006. Format: Paperback, 438 pp. Language: English.  
The Women of the All-American Girls Professional Baseball League: A biographical dictionary - W. C. Madden. Publisher: McFarland & Co., 1997. Format: Paperback, 295 pp. Language: English.

External links
All-American Girls Professional Baseball League
Baseball Historian

All-American Girls Professional Baseball League players
Baseball players from Ohio
People from Lisbon, Ohio
1931 births
1992 deaths
Fort Wayne Daisies players
Peoria Redwings players
20th-century American women
20th-century American people